Guan Yingying (born 13 September 1995) is a Chinese ice hockey forward and member of the Chinese national ice hockey team, currently playing in the Zhenskaya Hockey League (ZhHL) with the KRS Vanke Rays.

Guan represented China in the women's ice hockey tournament at the 2022 Winter Olympics in Beijing.

Playing career
Guan began playing ice hockey in 2007. She started playing professional ice hockey in 2021, joining the KRS Vanke Rays. 

She was captain of the Chinese team at the Winter Universiades in 2015, 2017, and 2019, losing in the bronze medal match in both 2015 and 2017. She won a silver medal at the 2017 Asian Winter Games as part of the Chinese ice hockey team. She was a member of the Chinese team at the 2022 Winter Olympics.

References

External links
 
 

1995 births
Living people
People from Shulan
Chinese women's ice hockey forwards
Shenzhen KRS Vanke Rays players
Ice hockey players at the 2022 Winter Olympics
Olympic ice hockey players of China
Medalists at the 2017 Asian Winter Games
Ice hockey players at the 2017 Asian Winter Games
Competitors at the 2015 Winter Universiade
Competitors at the 2017 Winter Universiade
Competitors at the 2019 Winter Universiade
Chinese expatriate sportspeople in Russia
Expatriate ice hockey players in Russia
Asian Games medalists in ice hockey
Asian Games silver medalists for China